The Khyber Pakhtunkhwa Local Government Act, 2012 was an act passed by the Provincial Assembly of Khyber Pakhtunkhwa on May 8th, 2012, and assented to by the Governor of Khyber Pakhtunkhwa on May 11th, 2012. The act repealed the North-West Frontier Province Local Government Ordinance, 2001.

President Asif Ali Zardari approved extension of the act to the Malakand Division and the Provincially Administered Tribal Areas (PATA).

References

2012 in Pakistani law
Local Government Act, 2012
Government of Khyber Pakhtunkhwa
Local government legislation
Repealed Pakistani legislation